Chadian men's national basketball team competes for the country Chad in international competition, governed by the Fédération Tchadienne de Basketball. The team is in zone 4 of FIBA Africa.

Its main accomplishment was the qualification for the 2011 FIBA Africa Championship.
There, Chad lost to the 2015 Champion Nigeria in the first round of the Knockout stage (also called Round of 16). Abderamane Mbaindiguim led the team in points per game with an average of 9.2.

Competitions

Summer Olympics
yet to qualify

FIBA Basketball World Cup

AfroBasket

AfroCan

Islamic Solidarity Games
 2005 : 9th
 2013 : Did Not Participate
 2017 : To Be Determined

Current roster
Team for the 2015 Afrobasket Qualification:

Other notable players from Chad:

Head coach position
  Patrick Maucouvert – 2011

Past Rosters
2011 FIBA Africa Championship Roster
Head coach: Patrick Maucouvert

References

External links
 Archived records of Chad team participations
 Chadian Men National Team 2011 Presentation at Afrobasket.com

Men's national basketball teams
Basketball
1963 establishments in Chad
Basketball teams in Chad
Basketball in Chad